Turan (known as Orconikidze until 1999) is a village and municipality in the Shaki Rayon of Azerbaijan. It has a population of 1,796.

References

Populated places in Shaki District